Obovaria haddletoni is a species of freshwater mussel, an aquatic bivalve mollusk in the family Unionidae, the river mussels. This species is endemic to the United States.

This species was formerly in the genus Lampsilis, and was moved to Obovaria in 2008 based on morphological and zoogeographic analysis.

References

Molluscs of the United States
haddletoni
Molluscs described in 1964